Caecilia nigricans, commonly known as the Rio Lita caecilian, is a species of amphibian in the family Caeciliidae. It is a subterranean species located in Colombia, Ecuador, and Panama and its natural habitats include moist, subtropical or tropical lowland forests, plantations, rural gardens, and foothill forests. The species is of least concern, as it can be found in several protected areas in Colombia like Darién National Park, however it is still threatened by human activities like deforestation.

References

nigricans
Amphibians of Colombia
Amphibians of Ecuador
Amphibians of Panama
Amphibians described in 1902
Taxonomy articles created by Polbot